CJLY-FM, known on-air as Kootenay Co-op Radio, is a Canadian community radio station, which broadcasts at 93.5 FM in Nelson, British Columbia. The station also has rebroadcasters on 96.5 in Crawford Bay and 107.5 in New Denver, and 101.5 in South Slocan.

The station is one of several new community radio stations launched in the Kootenay region in the 2000s. Others include CHLI-FM in Rossland, CFAD-FM in Salmo, CJHQ-FM in Nakusp and CIDO-FM in Creston.

History
CJLY was started by volunteers in December 1996 and incorporated as a non-profit service co-operative in June 1998 in Nelson. It started intermittent broadcasting in the Nelson region in February 1999, with a 28-day special event broadcast exemption by the CRTC, and finally went on the air full-time the following autumn. after being granted a permanent CRTC license in August 2000.

On November 6, 2000, the station began broadcasting about 18 hours a day at a power of 75 watts. In November 2004, CJLY expanded its range and began broadcasting in the Kootenay Lake region, north of Nelson, on a new FM frequency, 96.5 FM. In fall 2008, CJLY began broadcasting in the community of New Denver at 107.5 FM.

The organization purchased a building at #308a Hall St in Nelson in March 2006.

Kootenay Co-op Radio broadcasts in a mountainous region of British Columbia's southeast corner, and its terrestrial signal reaches settlements in the Purcell Mountains, Selkirk Mountains and Monashee Mountains.

Structure
Kootenay Co-op Radio is cooperatively owned and operated by its members, who employ two staff for day-to-day operations. As of August 2007, Kootenay Co-op Radio has approximately 2,000 members and almost 150 active volunteers.

CJLY is a member of the National Campus and Community Radio Association.

Programming
Several national and internationally syndicated radio programs are produced in the studios of CJLY, including Deconstructing Dinner, Canadian Voices and World Report.

Other notable shows that have been produced at KCR include:
 Sinixt Radio, a show hosted by members of the Sinixt First Nation,
 Pickin' & Grinnin, the region's bluegrass music show,
 By the People, a show about participatory democracy in the Kootenay region, The Writer's Show, hosted by Holley Rubinsky,
 The Rank and File Voice, a show about labour-related topics, and
 'Kootenay Morning, a public affairs show spotlighting local issues, news and current events.

Podcasts
The station podcasts a select number of its spoken word programs on its podcasts page.

Music charts
The KCR Music Department submits weekly music charts to !earshot'', which is a project of the National Campus and Community Radio Association.

References

External links

 
 
 
 

Jly
Jly
Cjly
Radio stations established in 2000
2000 establishments in British Columbia
Nelson, British Columbia